The 1938 World Table Tennis Championships – Swaythling Cup (men's team) was the 12th edition of the men's team championship.  

Hungary won the gold medal defeating Austria 5–3 in the final. Czechoslovakia and the United States claimed bronze medals.

Swaythling Cup Final tables

Group 1

Group 1 Play Off

Group 2

Final

See also
List of World Table Tennis Championships medalists

References

-